Glenea mathematica is a species of beetle in the family Cerambycidae. It was described by James Thomson in 1857. It is known from Malaysia.

Subspecies
 Glenea mathematica alysson Pascoe, 1866
 Glenea mathematica anona Pascoe, 1867
 Glenea mathematica mathematica (Thomson, 1857)

References

mathematica
Beetles described in 1857